Bouillonville is a commune in the Meurthe-et-Moselle department in northeastern France.

Geography
The village lies on the left bank of the Rupt de Mad, which flows north through the middle of the commune.

Population

Sights
The German war cemetery, where rest 1,368 German soldiers from World War I.

See also
Communes of the Meurthe-et-Moselle department
Parc naturel régional de Lorraine

References

Communes of Meurthe-et-Moselle
World War I cemeteries in France